The Battle of Wadgaon (12–13 January 1779) was a battle fought between the Maratha Empire and the British East India Company near Vadgaon Maval village in Maharashtra and was part of the First Anglo-Maratha War.

Background
The port of Bombay (Mumbai) had been under British rule since 1661. Towards the second half of the 18th century, with the rise of the Maratha Empire, the British felt the need to secure the port and taking control of the supply routes to it from Bassein (now known as Vasai) to the north and from Pune to the east, both of which were part of the Maratha Empire. Also, the Marathas had started negotiations with the French, which was alarming for the British.
With this objective, on 6 March 1775 the British entered into the Treaty of Surat with Raghunathrao who was a claimant to the Peshwa throne. As per the treaty, Raghunathrao would be installed as Peshwa and in return would cede Salsette and Bassein Fort to the British.

British in the Bor Ghat
The campaign began in November 1778, when British forces under Capt. James Stewart and Col. Egerton, among others proceeded from Mumbai towards Pune via the Bor Ghat (this ghat was also used by Shivaji on his return from Surat and currently is part of Mumbai – Pune railway). Col. Egerton captured the Belapur fort and established a base at Panvel, while Capt. Stewart proceeded to Khandala (22 November 1778). The British forces number nearly 4000, inclusive of artillery and gun lashkars. Small contingents of infantry and cavalry were also with Raghunath Rao. The British were counting on Nana Phadnis to resist at Pune with a force of 7-8 thousand. Moreover, the British resident at Pune, Mr. Mostyn was convinced that Shinde and Holkar would desert Pune and join Raghoba as soon as the British were in sight! Both proved to be fatal errors for the British.

From Panvel, Col. Egerton reached Khopoli and established a second British base in the valley in the winter of 1778 . Capt. James Stewart had by then reached the village of Khandala and established a camp at the top of the ghat. Col Egerton followed suit and by the middle of December, a large British force had assembled there. Col. Egerton then divided his forces between Lt. Col Cay and Lt. Col Cockburn. Throughout the march from the fort at Mumbai, they had faced no resistance from the Marathas and the morale was thus sky high in the British camp.

Preliminaries
The East India Company's force from Bombay consisted of about 3,900 men (about 600 Europeans, the rest Asian) accompanied by many thousands of servants and specialist workers.  They were joined on the way by Raghunath Rao's forces, adding several thousand more soldiers, and more artillery.
The Maratha army included forces contributed by all the partners in the federation, tens of thousands in all, commanded by Tukojirao Holkar and General Mahadji Shinde.

Mahadji slowed down the British march and sent forces west to cut off its supply lines.  When they found out about this, the British halted at Talegaon, a few hours' brisk march from Pune, but days away for the thousands of support staff with their ox-drawn carts.  Now the Maratha cavalry harassed the enemy from all sides. The Marathas also utilized a scorched earth strategy, vacating villages, removing food-grain stocks, burning farmland and poisoning wells.

Battle
The British began to withdraw from Talegaon in the middle of the night, but the Marathas attacked, forcing them to halt in the village of Wadgaon (now called Vadgaon or Vadgaon Maval), where the British force was surrounded on 12 January 1779. By the end of the next day, the British were ready to discuss surrender terms, and on 16 January signed the 'Treaty of Wadgaon', the terms of which forced the Bombay government to relinquish all territories acquired by the Bombay office of the East India Company since 1773, the halting of a British force marching towards Pune from Bengal; and a share of revenues from the district of Broach (Bharuch).

Aftermath
In a spirit of chivalry, the Marathas permitted the British to retreat to Bombay. As per British historian James Douglas, this proved to be a strategic mistake with ramifications not just for the Maratha Empire, but the history of India, when he said that had Nana Fadnavis, the powerful minister in Pune, been like Napoleon or Edward I, no British soldier would have survived to tell the tale and the whole course of history of India would have been different.
The treaty of Wadgaon did not last very long and the British Governor-General in Bengal, Warren Hastings, rejected the treaty on the grounds that the Bombay officials had no legal power to sign it, and ordered that British interests be secured in the area.

Legacy
In 2003, a group named 'Express Nagrik Vadgaon Vijaystambh Pratishthan' installed a victory pillar to commemorate the victory in the Battle of Wadgaon. The victory at the Battle of Wadgaon is still celebrated in the region every year.

References

Wadgaon
1779 in India
Wadgaon
Wadgaon
Wadgaon